TTM may refer to:

Business and finance 
 Ticker symbol for Tata Motors on the New York Stock Exchange
 Thailand Tobacco Monopoly, a state enterprise in Thailand
 Televiziunea Târgu-Mureș, a Romanian local television station
 Trailing twelve months, the most-recent year of financial results
 Time to market, the length of time it takes from a product being conceived to its being available for sale
 Telegraphic transfer middle rate, an exchange rate convention in Japan

Science and medicine 
 Traditional Tibetan medicine
 Transtheoretical model of change, a concept in health psychology
 Targeted temperature management, therapeutic interventions to maintain a person's temperature at a specific value
 Trichotillomania, a disorder characterized by the urge to pull out one's hairs

Other uses 
 TTM (programming language)
 Turntablist transcription methodology, a musical notation system for scratching and turntablism
 Todos Tus Muertos, an Argentine rock music group
 Texas Transportation Museum
 The Three Musketeers, novel by Alexandre Dumas
 Tshakhuma Tsha Madzivhandila F.C., South African professional football club